The following is a list of people executed by the U.S. state of Texas between 1910 and 1919. During this period 51 people were executed by hanging.

Executions 1910–1919

See also
Capital punishment in Texas

References

1910
20th-century executions by Texas
1910s-related lists
1910s in Texas